Oak Grove may refer to:

Places in the United States

Alabama 
Bessemer, Alabama, also known as Oak Grove, Jefferson County, Alabama and home of schools named Oak Grove
Oak Grove, Alabama

Arizona 
 Oak Grove, Arizona

Arkansas 
Oak Grove, Arkansas (disambiguation), multiple places
Oak Grove Township, Lonoke County, Arkansas

California 
 Oak Grove, Butte County, California
 Oak Grove, Yuba County, California
 Oak Grove, former name of El Sobrante, California
 Oak Grove, San Diego County, California, site of Oak Grove Butterfield Stage Station, Warner Springs, and 2nd location of Camp Wright

Colorado 
Oak Grove, Colorado, located in Montrose County, Colorado

Delaware 
Oak Grove, Delaware, a number of places in Delaware

Florida 
Oak Grove, Citrus County, Florida
Oak Grove, Escambia County, Florida
Oak Grove, Gadsden County, Florida
Oak Grove, Gulf County, Florida
Oak Grove, Hardee County, Florida
Oak Grove, Okaloosa County, Florida
Oak Grove, Sumter County, Florida

Georgia 
Oak Grove, Georgia

Illinois 
Oak Grove, Illinois

Indiana 
 Oak Grove, Posey County, Indiana, located in Posey County, Indiana
 Oak Grove, Starke County, Indiana, located in Starke County, Indiana
 Oak Grove Township, Benton County, Indiana

Kentucky 
Oak Grove, Kentucky
Oak Grove, Trigg County, Kentucky

Louisiana 
Oak Grove, Ascension Parish, Louisiana, an unincorporated community in Ascension Parish, Louisiana
Oak Grove, Cameron Parish, Louisiana, an unincorporated community in Cameron Parish, Louisiana
Oak Grove, Grant Parish, Louisiana
Oak Grove, Lincoln Parish, Louisiana
Oak Grove, West Carroll Parish, Louisiana

Maryland 
 Oak Grove (La Plata, Maryland), listed on the National Register of Historic Places (NRHP) in Charles County, Maryland

Massachusetts 
Oak Grove (MBTA station), a stop on Boston's Orange Line subway, straddling Malden and Melrose, Massachusetts
Oak Grove Farm, Millis, listed on the NRHP in Norfolk County, Massachusetts

Michigan 
 Oak Grove, Livingston County, Michigan, a community in Cohoctah Township
 Oak Grove, Oakland County, Michigan, a community in Bloomfield Township & Auburn Hills
 Oak Grove, Otsego County, Michigan, a community in Bagley Township

Minnesota 
Oak Grove, Minnesota (formerly Oak Grove Township, Anoka County, Minnesota)

Mississippi 
Oak Grove, Mississippi, suburb of Hattiesburg, Mississippi.
Oak Grove (Church Hill, Mississippi), listed on the National Register of Historic Places in Jefferson County, Mississippi

Missouri 
Oak Grove Village, Missouri in Franklin County
Oak Grove Heights, Missouri in Greene County
Oak Grove, Jackson County, Missouri
Oak Grove, Madison County, Missouri

New Jersey 
Oak Grove, New Jersey

North Carolina 
Oak Grove (Erwin, North Carolina), listed on the National Register of Historic Places in Cumberland County, North Carolina
Oak Grove, Durham County, North Carolina
Oak Grove Township, Durham County, North Carolina
Oak Grove, Jones County, North Carolina
Oak Grove, Macon County, North Carolina
Oak Grove, Surry County, North Carolina

Ohio 
Oak Grove, Ohio

Oklahoma 
Oak Grove, Murray County, Oklahoma
Oak Grove, Pawnee County, Oklahoma
Oak Grove, Payne County, Oklahoma, located in Payne County, Oklahoma

Oregon 
Oak Grove, Oregon

Pennsylvania 
Oak Grove, Pennsylvania, a community at the start of PA Route 271 in Ligonier Township, Westmoreland County, Pennsylvania

South Carolina 
Oak Grove, South Carolina
Oak Grove, Hampton County, South Carolina, listed on the National Register of Historic Places in Hampton County, South Carolina

Tennessee 
Oak Grove, Clay County, Tennessee, an unincorporated community located in Clay County, Tennessee
Oak Grove, Hardin County, Tennessee, an unincorporated community
Oak Grove, Sumner County, Tennessee, a census-designated place
Oak Grove, Washington County, Tennessee, a census-designated place

Texas 
Oak Grove, Bowie County, Texas, an unincorporated community
Oak Grove, Kaufman County, Texas, a town
Oak Grove, Tarrant County, Texas, a suburb of Fort Worth
Oak Grove Power Plant, a power plant located in Robertson County, Texas

Virginia 
 Oak Grove, Westmoreland County, Virginia
 Oak Grove, Northumberland County, Virginia
 Oak Grove, Loudoun County, Virginia
 Oak Grove, Chesapeake, Virginia, located in Chesapeake, Virginia
 Oak Grove (Altavista, Virginia), listed on the National Register of Historic Places in Campbell County, Virginia
 Oak Grove (Eastville, Virginia), listed on the National Register of Historic Places in Northampton County, Virginia
 Oak Grove (Manakin-Sabot, Virginia), listed on the NRHP in Virginia
 Oak Grove United Methodist Church, Chesapeake, Virginia

West Virginia 
Oak Grove, Mercer County, West Virginia
Oak Grove, Pendleton County, West Virginia

Wisconsin 
Oak Grove, Barron County, Wisconsin, a town
Oak Grove, Dodge County, Wisconsin, a town
Oak Grove (community), Wisconsin, an unincorporated community
Oak Grove, Eau Claire County, Wisconsin, a ghost town
Oak Grove, Pierce County, Wisconsin, a town

Other uses 
 Battle of Oak Grove, Civil War battle that took place on June 25, 1862 in Henrico County, Virginia

See also 
Oakgrove (disambiguation)
Oak Grove School (disambiguation)
Oak Grove High School (disambiguation)
Oak Grove Elementary School (disambiguation)
Oak Grove School District (disambiguation)
Oak Grove Cemetery (disambiguation)
Oak Grove Township (disambiguation)